East Guadalcanal is a single-member constituency of the National Parliament of Solomon Islands. Located on the island of Guadalcanal, it was established in 1970 when the Governing Council was created and the number of elected seats increased from 14 to 17.

List of MPs

Election results

2014

2010

2006

2001

1997

1993

1989

1984

1980

1976

1973

1970

References

Governing Council of the Solomon Islands constituencies
Legislative Assembly of the Solomon Islands constituencies
Solomon Islands parliamentary constituencies
1970 establishments in the Solomon Islands
Constituencies established in 1970